In the EU accession process, it was decided to establish development agencies in the year of 2006 within the scope of the policy of decreasing inter-regional disparities and income differences in Turkey. Currently, there are 26 development agencies in Turkey. The Ministry of Development is responsible for the coordination of development agencies in Turkey.

Roots 
Since 1989, first development projects like GAP (The Southeastern Anatolian Project), DOKAP (Eastern Black Sea Project), DAKP (Eastern Anatolia Development Program), and ZBK (Zonguldak, Bartın, Karabük) began to be implemented under the coordination of State Planning Organization for the purpose of decreasing inter-regional disparities in Turkey. However, planning done by the center did not give enough fruitful results; also benefiting from the experiences of developed countries it was understood that developing "bottom-up" instead of "top-down" development policies is crucial.

A new approach, methods and institutional structuring models in parallel with regional development policy and practices of EU were emphasized and focused on regional development models by benefiting from the experiences of the EU countries on this issue.

Parallel to Nomenclature of Units for Territorial Statistics (NUTS) of the EU, nomenclature of units for territorial statistics in three levels is made in Turkey. In this context, NUTS-1 includes 12 regions, NUTS-2 includes 26 sub-regions and NUTS-3 includes 81 provinces. With the establishment of NUTS-2;
 Development of a national economic and social cohesion policy aimed at reducing regional disparities,
 Adoption of the legal framework to facilitate the implementation of the acquis under this chapter,
 Creation of a multi-annual budgeting procedures setting out priority criteria for public investment in the region,
 Strengthening the administrative structures for managing regional development
 Implementation of regional development plans
were aimed.

List 

Economic development organizations